Rukhsana Sultana (born Meenu Bimbet) is an Indian socialite known for being one of Sanjay Gandhi's close associates during the state of Emergency in India between 1975 and 1977. During this period she became known for leading Sanjay Gandhi's sterilisation campaign in Muslim areas of Old Delhi.

Personal life
Rukhsana was born as Meenu Bimbet to Zarina Sultana (sister of film actress, Begum Para) and Mohan Bimbet. She is connected through birth and marriage to a number of well-known personalities in Indian films and media. Rukhsana married Shivinder Singh Virk, an officer in the Indian Army. They later divorced. They have one daughter, Amrita Singh who was a leading Bollywood actress in the 1980s. Rukhsana is grandmother to Sara Ali Khan and Ibrahim Ali Khan, the children of Amrita, and mother-in-law to her former husband, Saif Ali Khan.

References 

Year of birth missing (living people)
Living people
Indian socialites
Indian women activists
Indian Muslims
Punjabi people
People from Jalandhar
Women from Punjab, India
Activists from Punjab, India
People of the Emergency (India)